Bandar (also Romanized as Bandār and Bendār; also known as Bandār-e Sheykh and Bindār) is a village in Sanjabi Rural District, Kuzaran District, Kermanshah County, Kermanshah Province, Iran. At the 2006 census, its population was 240, in 54 families.

References 

Populated places in Kermanshah County